Ozoralizumab (trade name Nanozora) is a humanized monoclonal antibody designed for the treatment of inflammatory diseases.

Ozoralizumab was developed by Pfizer Inc, and now belongs to Ablynx NV.  Ablynx has licensed the rights to the antibody in China to Eddingpharm.  In 2022, ozoralizumab was approved in Japan for the treatment of rheumatoid arthritis.

References 

Pfizer brands